Brok may refer to:

Places in Poland
 Gmina Brok, a district in Ostrów Mazowiecka County, Masovian Voivodeship
 Brok, Masovian Voivodeship, a town in Ostrów Mazowiecka County, Masovian Voivodeship
 Brok, Podlaskie Voivodeship, a village in Wysokie Mazowieckie County, Podlaskie Voivodeship
 Brok River, a tributary of the Bug River in Puszcza Biała

People

Surname
 Bronisław Brok, Polish director who made the 1959 film Octopus Cafe
 Elmar Brok (born 1946), German Member of the European Parliament
 Janne Brok (born 1987), Dutch cyclist with the UCI team Vrienden van het Platteland
 Pyotr Brok, finance minister of Russia, 1852–1858
 tom Brok family, powerful East Frisian line of chieftains
 Ocko I tom Brok (about 1345–1389), chieftain of the Brokmerland and the Auricherland
 Ocko II tom Brok (1407–1435), chieftain of the Brokmerland and the Auricherland

Given name
 Brok Harris (born 1985), South African rugby union footballer
 Brok Windsor, character in a Canadian comic book

Other
 BROK, a brand of beer brewed by Browar Koszalin in Poland

See also
 Brock (disambiguation)
 Broks, a surname, including a list of people with the name